James Stonehouse (born in Krugersdorp, South Africa) is a South African rugby union coach and the head coach of Currie Cup side the .

Rugby union

Early career

During his playing days, he was also a teacher at Hoërskool Ermelo between 1984 and 1997 and achieved success coaching their first team, guiding them to the Quarter Finals of the Director's Trophy in 1992 and to the Semi-Finals of the same competition in 1993. He was also the coach of the 's Craven Week (Under-18) side from 1990 to 1992 and from 1994 to 1997.

He also coached the ' Craven Week team in 2003 and 2004.

During this time, he also coached the Russia Under-19 team that participated at the FIRA European U19 Tournament in France, guiding them to victory in the Plate competition. He also coached the Russia Sevens side as they qualified for the 2001 Rugby World Cup Sevens tournament in Argentina. He was appointed as head coach of the  national team, but returned to South Africa shortly afterwards for family reasons.

In 2004, Stonehouse joined club side Pretoria Harlequins in the ' Carlton League competition, guiding them to the Semi-Finals in 2006, the first time in 22 years they achieved that feat. He also appointed as ' Craven Week coach for 2007 and 2008.

In 2005 and 2006, he also coached the Blue Bulls' Women's Sevens side and the Women's national Sevens side that won the Africa tournament held in Uganda.

Pumas

Toshiba Brave Lupus
In January 2015, Stonehouse announced his decision to leave the  after seven years with the side to join Japanese Top League side Toshiba Brave Lupus in April of the same year.

Representative sides

He also had short spells coaching sides on a short-term basis; he was one of the coaches of the Royal XV that played against the British & Irish Lions during the 2009 British & Irish Lions tour to South Africa, the South African Barbarians (North) side that faced  during the 2012 England rugby union tour of South Africa and of the South Africa President's XV side that won the 2013 IRB Tbilisi Cup.

Bodybuilding

Stonehouse also took part in bodybuilding competitions. He won the Mr South Africa competition in 2005 and came sixth in the Mr Universe competition in 2006.

References

Net Worth 
Stonehouse currently has a net worth of $1.5 Million (USD) or €1.467 Million (Euros.)

South African rugby union coaches
Living people
People from Krugersdorp
1964 births
Sportspeople from Gauteng